Pimelea glauca, commonly known as smooth riceflower, is a species of flowering plant in the family Thymelaeaceae and is endemic to eastern Australia. It has elliptic to more or less lance-shaped or linear leaves and creamy-white flowers arranged in heads of seven or more on the ends of the stems, with four lance-shaped to egg-shaped bracts at the base of the inflorescence.

Description
The bracts are smooth on the outside, hairy on the inside and have fringed edges. The plant is toxic to livestock.

Taxonomy and naming
Pimelea glauca was first formally described in 1810 by Robert Brown in the Prodromus Florae Novae Hollandiae et Insulae Van Diemen. The specific epithet glauca is from the Latin word glaucus meaning having bluish-grey or green colour, referring to the leaves of this species.

Distribution and habitat
Smooth riceflower grows in open forest, grassland, coastal heath and on dunes, in sandy soil. It is found in Queensland, New South Wales, the Australian Capital Territory, Victoria, South Australia and Tasmania. It is widespread in N.S.W., the A.C.T., Victoria and Tasmania. In South Australia it occurs in the south-east of the state, including on the Eyre and Yorke Peninsulas, and on Kangaroo Island.

References

External links
Pimelea glauca occurrence data from the Australasian Virtual Herbarium

glauca
Flora of Queensland
Flora of New South Wales
Flora of the Australian Capital Territory
Flora of Victoria (Australia)
Flora of Tasmania
Flora of South Australia
Plants described in 1810
Taxa named by Robert Brown (botanist, born 1773)